Heal Thyself Pt. 1: Instinct is an album by Canadian musician Steven Page. Released on 11 March 2016, it is his fifth full-length release outside of Barenaked Ladies. The album includes the track "Manchild," which was originally released on the "A Different Sort of Solitude" single.

A follow-up, Discipline: Heal Thyself, Pt. II, was released on September 14, 2018.

Track listing

Personnel
Steven Page - Vocals, guitar, keyboards, piano, organ, bass, flute, banjo and whistling on "Linda Ronstadt In the 70s," percussion, and drums on "No Song Left to Save Me"
Craig Northey - Electric guitar, acoustic guitar on "There's a Melody II," background vocals, keyboards, and bass on "No Song Left to Save Me"
Additional personnel
John Fields - Castanets on "Linda Ronstadt In the 70s"
Bryden Baird - Flugelhorn, French horn trumpet
Jason Baird - Saxophone, alto saxophone, clarinet, flute, bass
Jesse Baird - Background vocals, drums and percussion, alto horn,
Doug Elliot - Bass and whistling on "Linda Ronstadt In the 70s"
Pat Steward - Drums and percussion, tambourine, bicycle pump, whistling on "Linda Ronstadt In the 70s"
Isaac Page - Viola on tracks 1, 3, 4 and 11
Jonah Page - Background vocals on "I Can See My House From Here" and "Hole In the Moonlight"
Murray Atkinson - Electric and acoustic guitar, keyboards, and whistling on "Linda Ronstadt In the 70s"
Kevin Fox - Cello and background vocals
Karen Graves - Violin, background vocals, flute
Gene Hardy - Saxophone, tenor and baritone saxophones
Lori Nuic - Background vocals on "I Can See My House From Here"

Production
Producers: Steven Page, Craig Northey, and John Fields
Recording: Steven Page, Paul Forgues, Vic Florencia, Craig Northey, and John Fields
Mixing: John Fields, Paul David Hager, and Vic Florencia
Mastering: João Carvalho
Art Direction/Design: Paul McGrath
Concept/design: Christine Munn
Photography: Nikki Ormerod
Management: Ray Danniels and Cynthia Barry

References

2016 albums
Steven Page albums
Albums produced by Craig Northey
Albums produced by John Fields (record producer)
Albums produced by Steven Page